Zegartowice may refer to the following places:
Zegartowice, Kuyavian-Pomeranian Voivodeship (north-central Poland)
Zegartowice, Lesser Poland Voivodeship (south Poland)
Zegartowice, Świętokrzyskie Voivodeship (south-central Poland)